Lake Kenyatta, also Lake Mukunganya, is a lake in Lamu County, in southeastern Kenya.

Location
(est. pop. 50,000 in 2015). The coordinates of the lake are: 2°24'45.0"S, 40°40'53.0"E (Latitude:-2.412494; Longitude:40.681396).

Fauna
The lake supports herds of hippopotami, zebra, monkeys, waterbuck, buffalo and warthog. Also, a large number of wild birds are found here.

Silting
Due to encroachment from the rapidly increasing population in Mpeketoni, the lake is shrinking as a result of (a) silting (b) humans invading its wetlands (c) drilling of many boreholes in the catchment area and (d) invasion by large herds of domestic cattle.

See also
 Rift Valley lakes
 List of rivers of Kenya
 Mpeketoni

References

External links
 How squatters became land owners in Lamu

 
Kenyatta
Lamu County